Ferruccio Bruni (13 July 1899 – 2 November 1971) was an Italian middle-distance runner who competed at the 1924 Summer Olympics,

References

External links
 

1899 births
1971 deaths
Athletes (track and field) at the 1924 Summer Olympics
Italian male middle-distance runners
Olympic athletes of Italy